Tamara Goldsworthy is a Los Angeles-based cinematographer. Her most notable contributions have been in the field of documentary film making. During her career, Tamara shot many award-winning films including the 2001 Academy Award-winning documentary short Big Mama.

Tamara Goldsworthy has worked with renowned filmmakers Haskel Wexler, Joan Churchill, and Barbara Kopple. Her work is shown regularly on PBS, BBC, Animal Planet as well as international film festivals.

References

External links 

Tiger Next Door
Yahoo TV Entry

American cinematographers
American women cinematographers
Living people
Year of birth missing (living people)
American documentary filmmakers
American women documentary filmmakers
21st-century American women